Ehrlich is a small lunar impact crater named after the German scientist Paul Ehrlich. It is located in the northern hemisphere on the Moon's far side. It lies within a rugged region that has been extensively bombarded by impacts of comparable size. Ehrlich lies about midway between the craters Parsons to the south and the heavily worn Guillaume to the north.

This is a worn crater with features that have become softened and rounded due to bombardment. A pair of small craters are attached to the exterior along the southern rim. The interior floor and inner walls are nearly featureless and there are no impacts of note within the rim.

Satellite craters
By convention these features are identified on lunar maps by placing the letter on the side of the crater midpoint that is closest to Ehrlich.

References

 
 
 
 
 
 
 
 
 
 
 
 

Impact craters on the Moon
Paul Ehrlich